Klubi i Futbollit Besëlidhja Lezhë is an Albanian football club based in the northern city of Lezhë. Their home ground is the Brian Filipi Stadium and they currently compete in the Kategoria e Parë.

History
The club was founded in 1930 under the name Bardhyli Lezhë and participated in the Kategoria Superiore for the first time in 1937 where they finished in sixth place out of ten clubs. The club then changed its name to Liria Lezhë in 1945, SK Lezhë in 1949, Puna Lezhë just two years later in 1951, Fitorja Lezhë in 1958 and finally Besëlidhja Lezhë in 1968. They played top level in 1937, 1950, 1952, 1970–71, between 1972 and 1975, 1978–79, between 1980 and 1983, between 1984 and 1986, between 1987 and 1990, between 1993 and 1996, between 2000–2003 and 2007–2008.

In the 2006/07 season, the club played in the Kategoria e Dytë. They were promoted to the first division for the 2007/08 season. But for the 2008/09 season, they have again been relegated to the Kategoria e Parë 2008–2009.

Honours and Achievements

 Kategoria e Parë:
 Winners (7): 1969–70, 1977–78, 1979–80, 1983–84, 1986–87, 1992–93, 1999–00

Records
Biggest ever home league victory: Besëlidhja Lezhë 7–0 KS Gramozi Ersekë – 11 April 2012
Biggest ever home league defeat: Besëlidhja Lezhë 3–4 Kukesi – 23 April 2012
Biggest ever away league victory: KF Laçi 1–7 Besëlidhja Lezhë – 18 December 2004
Biggest ever away league defeat: KF Tirana 5–1 Besëlidhja Lezhë – 21 February 2003

Sponsorship

Current squad

Historical list of coaches

 Isuf Pelingu (1971-1975)
 Lin Shllaku (1973-1974)
 Isuf Pelingu (1981)
 Nikolin Lorenci (1982-1983)
 Anastas Buneci (1983-1984)
 Vasil Bici (1984–1985)
 Ritvan Kulli (1992-1993)
 Vasil Bici (1993–1995)
 Paulin Deda (1995)
 Taip Piraniqi (1996)
 Luan Vakatana (1999-2000)
 Vasil Bici (2001-2002)
 Medin Zhega (2002)
 Ritvan Kulli (2003)
 Xhavit Gruda (2003)
 Stavri Nica ( – 11 Sep 2007)
 Neptun Bajko (1 Dec 2007 – 22 Feb 2008)
 Ilir Gjyla (22 Feb 2008 - Jun 2008)
 Alban Bruka (2010)
 Ritvan Kulli (2010 - 2012)
 Sokol Meta (Aug 2012)
 Gledis Lani (2012)
 Saimir Malko ((Dec 2012 - Mar 2013)
 Sinan Bardhi ((Mar 2013 - Dec 2014)
 Ritvan Kulli (2015)
 Kreshnik Krepi (Jul 2015 - 25 Jan 2016)
 Samuel Nikaj (25 Jan 2016 - Jun 2016)
 Stavri Nica (Jul 2016 – Nov 2016)
 Alban Bruka (2016-2017)
 Elvis Plori (Jun 2017 - Nov 2017) 

 Gledis Lani (Nov 2017 - May 2018)
 Ndriçim Kashami (Jul 2018 - Oct 2018)
 Gledis Lani (Oct 2018 - Dec 2018)
 Vladimir Gjoni (Dec 2018 - Sep 2019)
 Elvis Plori (Sep 2019 - Aug 2020)
 Alban Bruka (Aug 2020 - Oct 2022)
 Hasan Hoxha (Oct 2022 - Nov 2022)
 Nikolin Çoçlli (Nov 2022 - Feb 2023)
 Artan Bano (Feb 2023 - )

References

External links
Official supporters Website
Lezha Sport
News and Standings
Albania Sport

Football clubs in Albania
Association football clubs established in 1930
1930 establishments in Albania